In the Year 2889 may refer to:

 In the Year 2889 (film), a 1967 post-apocalyptic, made-for-television science fiction film directed by Larry Buchanan
 In the Year 2889 (short story), an 1889 short story published under the name of Jules Verne, but now believed to be mainly the work of his son Michel Verne